The inauguration of Franklin Pierce as the 14th president of the United States was held on Friday, March 4, 1853, at the East Portico of the United States Capitol in Washington, D.C. This was the 17th inauguration and marked the commencement of the only four-year term of both Franklin Pierce as president and William R. King as vice president. Chief Justice Roger B. Taney administered the presidential oath of office. Pierce affirmed the oath of office rather than swear it, and was also the first president to recite his inaugural address from memory.

Ill with tuberculosis, King was in Spanish Cuba in an effort to recover in the warmer climate, and was not able to be in Washington to take his oath of office on March 4. By a Special Act of Congress, he was allowed to take the oath outside the United States, and was sworn in on March 24, 1853. He is the only vice president to be sworn in while in a foreign country. King died  days into his term, and the office remained vacant since there was no constitutional provision which allow an intra-term vice-presidential office filling; it would be regulated by the Twenty-fifth Amendment in 1967.

See also
Presidency of Franklin Pierce
1852 United States presidential election

References

External links

More documents from the Library of Congress
Text of Pierce's Inaugural Address

United States presidential inaugurations
1853 in American politics
1853 in Washington, D.C.
Inauguration
March 1853 events